Bardo  is a historical town in Ząbkowice Śląskie County, Lower Silesian Voivodeship, in south-western Poland. It is the seat of the administrative district (gmina) called Gmina Bardo.

Bardo lies on the Eastern Neisse river, flowing out of the Kłodzko Valley towards the Silesian Lowlands. As of December 2021, the town has a population of 2,440.

The town is a widely known place of pilgrimage and adoration of the Virgin Mary.

History

Bardo was founded in the 10th century as a Polish defensive gord on a medieval trade route from Prague across the Sudetes via Kłodzko to Wrocław and Gniezno. The surrounding area was populated by Lechitic tribes and became part of the emerging Polish state in the 10th century under first historic ruler Mieszko I of Poland. Bardo's castellans were Polish knights. They secured the southern border of the Lower Silesian lands with adjacent Kłodzko Land in Bohemia.

In 1096 Duke Bretislaus II of Bohemia captured and devastated the fortress, nevertheless in 1137 it returned to Poland. The following year, due to the fragmentation of Poland, Bardo became part of the Polish Duchy of Silesia. From 1278 it belonged to the Duchy of Jawor under the Piast duke Bolko I the Strict, from 1321 to the Duchy of Ziębice under Duke Bolko II. With Ziębice, Bardo was vassalized by the Kingdom of Bohemia in 1336, however, it remained under rule of local Polish dukes of the Piast dynasty until 1428.
Its chapel was built in the 10th century, and it was first mentioned in 1189 as being granted to the Knights Hospitaller by the Bishops of Wrocław. In 1210 it passed to the Canons Regular at Kamieniec Abbey. By 1290 the gord had lost its strategic importance and ceased to exist as a castellany. In 1299 the whole area was purchased by the Cistercian order and was owned by them until 1810. The image of the Madonna dates back to the 13th century, probably the oldest in Silesia. The Baroque pilgrimage church was erected between 1686 and 1704. The sanctuary was visited twice by the future Pope John Paul II, in 1957 and 1978. In 1981 a monument of Pope John Paul II was unveiled in Bardo, as the second in Poland after Kraków.

After the First Silesian War, Bardo along with most of Silesia was annexed by Prussia in 1742. From 1871 to 1945 it was part of Germany, and after the defeat of Nazi Germany in World War II it became again part of Poland under border changes promulgated at the Potsdam Conference. Also in accordance with the agreement, the German population was expelled and Bardo was repopulated by Poles, most of whom were themselves expelled from former eastern Poland annexed by the Soviet Union. In 1949–1950 Greeks and Macedonians, refugees of the Greek Civil War, were temporarily admitted in Bardo, before new homes were found for them in other towns.

Bardo had gained the status of a town in the early 14th century, but this was lost as the result of the destruction caused by World War II. It became the seat of a gmina in 1954, and was granted town status again in 1969.

Sights

Historic buildings still existing in Bardo include:
 a 15th-century stone bridge across the Nysa Kłodzka River
 Basilica of the Visitation, a Baroque pilgrimage church with an altarpiece by Michael Willmann
 Redemptorist monastery
 numerous historic townhouses in the Old Town (Stare Miasto)
 Ursuline Convent
 Monastery of the Congregation of the Sisters of Mary Immaculate
 Różańcowa Góra (Mount Rosary) chapels
 ruins of the medieval Piast Castle

Gallery

International relations

Twin towns - sister cities
See twin towns of Gmina Bardo.

See also
 Lower Silesian Voivodeship
 Tourism in Poland

References

External links

 Official website 

Cities and towns in Lower Silesian Voivodeship
Bardo
Cities in Silesia